"Papi's Home" is a song by Canadian rapper Drake. It is the second track from Drake's sixth studio album Certified Lover Boy, released in 2021. The song features uncredited vocals from Drake's former Young Money labelmate Nicki Minaj.

Charts

References

2021 songs
Drake (musician) songs
Songs written by Drake (musician)